Polystira eloinae is a species of sea snail, a marine gastropod mollusk in the family Turridae, the turrids.

Description
The length of the shell attains 56 mm.

Distribution
This marine species occurs off Cuba.

References

External links
 Espinosa J., Ortea J. & Moro L. (2017). Seis nuevas especies caribeñas del género Polystira Woodring, 1928 (Mollusca: Neogastropoda: Turridae). Avicennia. 20: 35-40.

eloinae
Gastropods described in 2017